The Frecciarossa 1000, is a high-speed train operated by Italian state railway operator Trenitalia. It was co-developed as a joint venture between Italian rail manufacturer Hitachi Rail Italy (initially AnsaldoBreda) and multinational conglomerate Alstom (initially Bombardier Transportation). Both design and production work were divided between the two partner companies.

Design work on the train began in 2008, with considerable design work performed by Bertone. It was heavily based on existing products, including Bombardier's Zefiro and AnsaldoBreda's V250 trains. The design was modified in order to conform with the requirements of the Trenitalia tender. In 2010, the ETR 1000 was selected and a total of 50 trainsets were ordered to meet Trenitalia's needs. Upon the public unveiling of the first example of the type, it was hailed as being the fastest train to reach series production in Europe at that time.

History and design

Early work
During the mid 2000s, Italian state railway operator Ferrovie dello Stato became increasingly interested in the acquisition of a new very-high-speed train for its Eurostar Alta Velocità Frecciarossa (Eurostar high speed Red Arrow) services along the Turin-Milan-Florence-Rome-Naples corridor. Having become aware of this interest, Italian rail manufacturer AnsaldoBreda and multinational conglomerate Bombardier Transportation decided to partner up to produce a suitable train in 2008. It was decided to centralise design work by the joint venture at a single location, working out of an office at Bombardier’s manufacturing plant at Hennigsdorf.

According to rail industry publication Rail Engineer, Bombardier personnel were responsible for conducting the concept and detailed design phases of development, as well as for the provision of propulsion equipment and bogies, homologation efforts, testing, and the commissioning of the first five trains. Meanwhile, AnsaldoBreda developed the train's industrial design, including body, interior, signalling and other systems, in addition to performing the final assembly and commissioning of series production trains. Both firms were involved in detail design and engineering activity.

Italian vehicle manufacturer and design company Gruppo Bertone was involved in the designing of the train's aesthetics and appearance. It was instructed to produce a style that accentuated its elegance and speed, but would also conform with various international railway standards, such as driver visibility, crash protection, and headlight functionality. Bertone's design was reviewed by the team and subject to various tests, including the use of a wind tunnel, which proved it to produce compliant drag coefficients and crosswind stability levels. The train's design includes an active suspension system.

Having been deemed suitable for presentation, the vehicle design, which had been formally designated as the Zefiro 300, was submitted by the joint venture as a response to Ferrovie dello Stato's tender for 50 new high-speed trainsets. Other requirements included the train being suitable for a condition-based maintenance programme, while it was capable of being operated across seven different European countries, specifically the railway systems of Austria, Belgium, France, Germany, Netherlands, Spain and Switzerland.

The maximum speed specified by the tender exceeded that of the initial design, thus the design team was reassembled by AnsaldoBreda's Pistoia facility for a period of six months to revise the design to comply with the requirements outlaid. Reportedly, the new top speed required a detailed reexamination of the design, and in some cases the redesign, to be performed for various elements of the train, including the bogies, power and control systems and pantograph. While the train was to only fitted with ERTMS Level 2 and the legacy Italian signalling system, passive provisions also had to be found for a number of other signalling systems that had been listed in the requirement.

Selection and delivery
During August 2010, it was announced that Trenitalia had awarded the contract to the Bombardier/Ansaldo joint venture, and that the first example was set to come into revenue service during 2013. The bid was determined to have been less expensive at €30.8m per train than the €35m per train cost given by the other bidder, French manufacturer Alstom; the contract value was €1.54bn of which Bombardier's share was €654m. Marco Sacchi, Hitachi Rail Italy’s head of engineering, attributed the outcome as having been a result of the specially-developed solutions involved in the train's design that had gained Trenitalia's favour. The joint venture moved into the detailed design phase immediately following news of the selection.

During August 2012, a full-scale mock up of the train was publicly unveiled at Rimini by the Italian Prime Minister Mario Monti. By this point, the train has received its official service designation, the 'Frecciarossa 1000'. On 26 March 2013, the first trainset was unveiled during a public ceremony at the Ansaldo-Breda facilities in Pistoia; this train was formally named Pietro Mennea, in memory of the Italian world record holder of the 200 metres track sprint event from 1979 to 1996, who had died five days earlier.

During August 2013, testing commenced on the Genoa-Savona line, before being transferred to conducting night time runs held between Milan and Bologna. On 25 April 2015, it was announced that the testing phase of development had been successfully completed. To mark the occasion, a special inaugural service featuring various high-profile guests, including the president of Italy, Sergio Mattarella, was performed between Milan and Rome.

Into service

During June 2015, commercial services using the type commenced, having officially entered service for Expo 2015. According to Bombardier, following the first three months of service, Trenitalia had reported back to them that they had experienced the easiest introduction of a new train into service in their history with the type, and that it had attained all of its reliability targets. The number of services performed by the type have gradually expanded as further examples have been delivered from the assembly line; as of September 2016, a total of 36 trains were in revenue service. At one point, trains were reportedly leaving the factory at the rate of two per week.

The introduction of the ETR 1000 shall enable Trenitalia to redeploy its existing ETR 500 high-speed trains onto other routes, such as Milan – Venice and the Adriatic coast. Early on, it was also declared by FS president Marcello Messori that the Frecciarossa 1000 had enabled Trenitalia to compete in the international high-speed market, and that it had been approved for operation in France, Germany, Spain, Austria, Switzerland, the Netherlands, and Belgium. On 28 October 2015, Trenitalia acknowledged that it was holding preliminary discussions between its suppliers and regulatory bodies regarding its interest in the prospective launch of an open access high speed service between Paris and Brussels; Pietro Diamantini of FS Group's Passenger Division stated that it could be the first international corridor on which the ETR 1000 would be deployed.

On 26 February 2016, a Frecciarossa 1000 reportedly attained a peak speed of  while traversing the Torino-Milano high speed line. On 28 May 2018, the Italian Ministry of Infrastructure and Transport and the ANSF announced that no further tests will be carried out and the speed limit of  will not be raised.

Spain 
 
In 2022, the Spanish railway company Iryo (owned by ILSA, Intermodalidad de Levante S.A.) began service, having ordered a fleet of twenty S 109 trainsets similar to the Italian units ETR 1000.

Incidents 
On 6 February 2020 unit number 21 was involved in a high-speed derailment at Livraga (Lodi), on the Milan-Bologna high-speed line, operating the first service of the day. It caused the death of the two train drivers and the injury of 31 people.

See also
ICE 4
CAF Oaris
TCDD HT80000

References

External links

 
 Documentation and press information 

AnsaldoBreda multiple units
Bombardier Transportation multiple units
Ferrovie dello Stato Italiane electric railcars and multiple units
Passenger trains running at least at 300 km/h in commercial operations
Passenger trains running at least at 250 km/h in commercial operations
Passenger trains running at least at 200 km/h in commercial operations
15 kV AC multiple units
3000 V DC multiple units
25 kV AC multiple units
1500 V DC multiple units of France
Alstom multiple units